There is no current State Route 29 in the U.S. state of Alabama.

See U.S. Route 29 in Alabama for the current route numbered 29
See Alabama State Route 29 (pre-1957) for the former SR 29